is a railway station on the Muroran Main Line in Yuni, Yūbari District, Hokkaido, Japan, operated by Hokkaido Railway Company (JR Hokkaido).

Lines
Furusan Station is served by the Muroran Main Line.

Station layout
The station has two ground-level opposed side platforms serving two tracks. Kitaca is not available. The station is unattended.

Platforms

Adjacent stations

See also
 List of railway stations in Japan

References

Railway stations in Hokkaido Prefecture
Railway stations in Japan opened in 1943